Bear Grylls: Face the Wild is an American reality show series that premiered on March 21, 2018 on Facebook Watch. It follows adventurer Bear Grylls as he leads a select few of his fans out into the wilderness as they share personal stories from their lives.

Premise
Bear Grylls: Face the Wild features "10 of Grylls’ fans who have been invited to accompany him on an adventure to face the wild. Participants will share their stories as Bear pushes them out of their comfort zones and teaches them how the wild can be not only eye-opening, but also ultimately empowering."

Production
On January 16, 2018, it was announced that Facebook Watch had ordered a first season of Bear Grylls: Face the Wild, a new reality series starring adventurer Bear Grylls. Executive producers are set to include Grylls, Delbert Shoopman, Chris Grant, Drew Buckley, Rob Buchta, and Justin Dudek. Production companies involved with the series include Bear Grylls Ventures and Electus.

Grylls and his production staff found the season's participants by putting out an open call online for video applications in October 2017. By the time the submission period was over, they had received over 500,000 submissions. The first season was filmed in the Sierra Nevada mountain region in California. The area was ideal for the production due to high mountains, desert, canyons, ravines, and forests. This allowed the series to feature different terrains and provided a central location for participants to get to that includes immense wilderness. He has said that he found Facebook to be a good fit for the series as a more conventional network, such as NBC, would most likely be disinterested in the notion of showcasing everyday people as opposed to the celebrities featured in Running Wild with Bear Grylls.

Episodes

Release
On March 13, 2018, Facebook released the first official trailer for the series.

See also
 List of original programs distributed by Facebook Watch

References

External links
 

Facebook Watch original programming
2010s American reality television series
2018 American television series debuts
2018 American television series endings
English-language television shows
American non-fiction web series